Celithemis fasciata (banded pennant) is a dragonfly in the skimmer family. It is native to the United States, where it is found in the south-central, southeastern, and eastern regions.

The extensive, sharply defined black markings on its wings are distinctive, but the pattern varies considerably; individuals from the northern part of its range tend to have less wing coloration.

It lives around ponds, lakes, and ditches.

References

External links
Photo Gallery. Discover Life.
Celithemis fasciata. USGS.

Libellulidae
Insects described in 1889